The chancellor is the formal head of Durham University. They are nominated by the council and senate in joint session and appointed by convocation.  the office is vacant, after Sir Thomas Allen stepped down from the role. He will be succeeded in summer 2023 by Fiona Hill, who was elected by convocation on 28 November 2022.

Until 1909, the university was governed by the dean and chapter of Durham Cathedral, with the warden (held ex officio by the Dean of Durham from 1862) being both the formal and executive head of the university. Following the implementation of statutes made in 1909 under the University of Durham Act 1908, the warden became the chancellor and the sub-warden the vice-chancellor, meaning Durham was, like most other British universities, headed by a chancellor.

 1909–1912 George William Kitchin, Dean of Durham
 1913–1918 Henry Percy, 7th Duke of Northumberland
 1919–1928 John Lambton, 3rd Earl of Durham
 1929–1930 Alan Percy, 8th Duke of Northumberland
 1931–1949 Charles Vane-Tempest-Stewart, 7th Marquess of Londonderry
 1950–1957 G. M. Trevelyan
 1958–1969 Lawrence Lumley, 11th Earl of Scarbrough
 1971–1980 Malcolm MacDonald
 1981–1990 Dame Margot Fonteyn (first non-royal female chancellor of a British university)
 1992–2004 Sir Peter Ustinov
 2005–2011 Bill Bryson
 2012–July 2022 Sir Thomas Allen
 From 2023 Fiona Hill

Source: Durham University records.

See also
 List of vice-chancellors and wardens of Durham University
 List of Durham University people
 History of Durham University

References

Durham University

Chancellors
Durham
1909 establishments in England
Durham